Memphis Guitars were guitars produced during the late 1970s and throughout the 1980s.

Overview
"Memphis"-branded guitars and signal processors were affordable music gear imported from Asia and distributed in the United States by C. Bruno and Sons from 1969 until November 1989. The product line included Fender- and Gibson-styled instruments as well as some original designs such as the MG-100 and MG-300 which are considered to be a much higher quality compared to copies. 

In the early years, Memphis  was a house brand were manufactured by Matsumoku Industrial of Nagoya, Japan. Later, original designs were apparently built by Yamaki [which also built guitars under its own Daion brand, as well as for Washburn and other guitar companies]. [Confirming information is difficult or impossible to find. However, the general consensus in the online guitar community, based  upon the strong similarities between certain Memphis models and other guitars bearing the Washburn brand, is that both brands were built at least for a time by Yamaki Gakki.]

The Memphis name also appears on various guitar-effects pedals, including delays, reverbs, overdrives, and the Memphis Fuzz. One of the most common is the Memphis phase shifter, named "Roto Phase" [likely a hint that the pedal is aimed at guitarists who want the Leslie rotating-speaker effect without the bulky cabinet]. It is a simple-to-use stompbox featuring single monophonic input and output jacks, and a single knob that controls the speed of the rotating-speaker effect.

External links
 Vintaxe weblink
 The Gear Page.com web blog

Guitars

pt:Guitarras Memphis